Pleasantdale School District 107 is a school district headquartered on the grounds of Pleasantdale Middle School in Burr Ridge, Illinois. It operates the district's elementary school in LaGrange, Illinois.

References

External links
 

School districts in Cook County, Illinois